Dicheniotes tephronota is a species of tephritid or fruit flies in the genus Dicheniotes of the family Tephritidae.

Distribution
Eritrea.

References

Tephritinae
Insects described in 1908
Taxa named by Mario Bezzi
Diptera of Africa